Muneeswarar, or Muneeswaran (Tamil: முனீஸ்வரன்), is a popular Hindu deity within Hinduism, and is worshipped by many, in countries such as India, Malaysia, Singapore and many more. He is sometimes referred to by different names, such as Muniyandi, Muniyappan, Muni Ayya, Ayya amongst many others. Muneeswarar is mostly considered a guardian deity or minor, but is in some cases hierarchically considered to be on par with Lord Shiva, one of the main deities in the Hindu trinity.  Although not much is known on the exact origins and history of Muneeswarar, he is often regarded to be related to the Hindu Lord Shiva. His name is a combination of "Muni" (sage or saint), and "Ishvara", an epithet or title of Shiva.

Depiction 
Muneeswarar is often believed to be an old/middle aged male deity. He is often portrayed wearing a large moustache and wielding weapons such as a trident, Indian machete, whip and spear. His forehead and body is believed to be smeared with holy ash, an indication of his association with Lord Shiva.

Muneeswaran is mostly worshipped in the form of statues (granite, metals, clay etc) depicting his physical appearance, or merely in the form of the weapons he is associated with. In some cases, he is also worshiped in the form of a rock, brick, lamp or nothing at all. He is sometimes accompanied by other minor deities and animals (bulls, horses or dogs), which are believed to be his vehicles.

Different Worship Methods 
Muneeswarar is worshipped in both the orthodox Vedic ways as well as the Non-Vedic ways. The former is based heavily on the Vedas, Agamas and other sacred Hindu texts. Muneeswarar worship in this regard is usually done in an elaborate and systematic way, with many strict rules to be followed. For example, prayers and rituals are usually conducted in the Sanskrit language by Bhramins, and only vegetarian food products are offered to the deity for prayers and rituals. This method is mostly common in Agamic temples that are very common in India, Singapore and Malaysia. In such temples, Muneeswaran is venerated as a “higher” deity, and treated as Lord Shiva himself.

The Non-Vedic way on the other hand is less rigid and not heavily bounded to sacred texts like the Vedas and Agamas. Its worship methods sometimes involve the usage of many items and methods that are otherwise considered taboo in Vedic Hinduism. Theses include things such as animal sacrifices, the offerings of non-vegetarian food items, alcohol and tobacco. This form of worship sometimes also sees the innovation of deity through phenomenons like Alaipu or trance. This style of worships can be found in Non-Agamic temples, shrines and homes. Due to the differences in worship methods, Muneeshwaran has a variety of disciples from many different demographics.

History and Legend
The history of Muneeshwaran and his worship remains ambiguous and unclear. In Hindu sacred texts such as the Vedas and Puranas, there is no explicit mention of the deity. However, it is sometimes suggested that Muneeshwaran was present in most of these texts, but represented with a different name. Apart from this claim, most of the widely accepted histories of the deity stems from oral traditions, that have been passed down from one generation to another. Due to the lack of textual references, there is no way of verifying these claims and tracing their origins. Most of these oral histories, although not entirely the same, seem to share commonalities with many stories from Hindu texts.  One such legend of the origins of Muneeswaran is that of the omission of Lord Shiva from the Daksha Yajna, an elaborate ritual conducted by Dakshan, Lord Shiva’s father in law. Lord Shiva was enraged by this, causing multiple deities to be formed in the process. Munishwaran was believed to be one of the deities that was formed. There are contrasting claims as to whether the deity was born from Lord Shiva’s face, his sweat or simply created by him.   In another legend, Muneeshwaran is considered to be a great devotee of Lord Shiva who lived a long time ago, although the time is not specified. Muneeshwaran pleased Lord Shiva through his devotion, and thus the latter awarded him the title of “Iswaran” and blessed him as him guardian deity.   Some devotees and organisations closely related to the deity also acknowledge that Muneeshwaran does no have a history. Their worship and faith stems from the deities miracles and current phenomena rather than from historical sources.   Despite all these differing claims, almost all accept the strong relation between Muneeshwaran and Lord Shiva. In some cases, Muneeshwaran is believed to be created by Shiva. In others he is believed to be a from of Shiva. In some cases, he is seen to be Shiva himself. This can be seen in temples where Muneeshwaran is depicted and worshipped in the exact same way as Lord Shiva. Examples of this include the Sri Munishwaran temple in Singapore, where Muneesharan wears a snake around his neck and has the Nandhi (vehicle of Shiva) in front of him, just like Shiva.

Different Forms 
In some cases, there seems to be more than one form of Muneeshwaran, with each having his own respective characteristics and traits. The number of forms of Muneeshwaran vary from 3,7,9,18,108 and even 1008 in some cases. The most common forms are Shiva Muni, Maha Muni, Gnana Muni, Paandi Muni, Dharma Muni, Naadha Muni, Jada Muni, Vaal Muni, Thava Muni. Most other forms of  Muneeshwaran are inspired from the above mentioned. In special cases, new forms of Muneeshwarans are introduced based on the devotees perception, vision or dream of the deity. An example of this slightly altered form of the deity would be Sri Veera Muthu Muneeshwaran in Singapore, in which the deity is portrayed as a strong warrior.

In most cases, Muneeshwaran is portrayed to be a fierce man, which supposedly is dedicated towards to the destruction of evil and other negative traits of humans alike. In other cases, Muneeshwaran is portrayed in a peaceful manner, which supposedly denotes his spiritual and boon giving tendencies. Despite the difference in intensity, Muneeshwaran is almost always seen wearing a long and thick moustache and holding weapons, like a trident, machete or whip.

Worship in Singapore and Malaysia 
Besides India, Muneeshwaran worship is extremely popular in Singapore and Malaysia, with many shrines and temples dedicated to the deity. Most of these temples were initially set up by immigrants that came to Malaya from Tamilnadu, particularly Thiruchirapalli, Madurai and Salem, where the worship of the deity was prevalent. Newer temples of Muneeshwaran were set up by descendants of these early Tamil migrants.

Most shrines and temples started with the worship of simple religious objects that represented the deity, such as hero stones, tridents, small bricks or stones. As the temples developed over the years, they built more intricate and complex statues of the deity, which portrayed his physical features. Some of these statues are colourfully painted and taller than average human beings. Other temple structures, such as Gopurams, were also developed and upgraded. Some of these small temples were converted into Vedic temples in the years. While this was the case for most temples, some temples still continue to be in its original state till date.

Muneeshwaran is sometimes worshipped along with deities from other religions, such as Taoism and Buddhism. Countries like Singapore and Malaysia are home to people of many different cultures and faiths, which allows for the above mentioned phenomenon. In these instances, Muneeshwaran is seen as a contemporary to the deities of the various faiths. He is sometimes also venerated in different ways, including the offering Chinese joss sticks and food items.

Trance 
Trance is an important phenomenon that occurs in some forms of Muneeshwaran worship, particularly the Non-Vedic ones. This phenomenon essentially enables the deity to possess the body of a human, who then goes on to display physical traits of the deity. This is usually done at major festivals or prayers, and is considered to be a clear sign of the physical presence or blessing of the deity. Some practitioners willingly invoke the deity into their bodies, while for others it happens without their control. Trance is also used as a platform for devotees to communicate with the deity and vice versa, to provide solutions and advises for a multitude of topics.

This topic is highly controversial and does not have unanimous support. Some claim that Muneeshwaran is god, who is above all human attributes and perceptions. Thus, it is impossible and not practical for him to possess people. Others on the other hand believe that his spirit is within the earthly realms, and thus it is possible for one to be possessed by him.

References

External links
 Muniswarar.com - Online Ayya Temple
 http://www.ruthrakali.org.sg/htmlfiles/muneeswaran.htm
 Anbe Muneeswarar - site with a lot of information about Sri Muneeswarar
 http://www.indiadivine.org/audarya/shakti-sadhana/445079-not-kateri-parmeshwari-dee-mata-2.html
 https://makemyservice.net/category/spiritual/

Forms of Shiva
Tamil deities